The Vale of Rheidol Railway is a  narrow gauge heritage railway in Ceredigion, Wales, between Aberystwyth and Devil's Bridge; a journey of .

It opened in 1902, and from the withdrawal of main line steam on British Rail in 1968 until privatisation in 1989, it was the sole steam-operated line on the 1948 nationalised British Rail network. It was one of the first parts of British Rail to be privatised. Unlike most other preserved railways in the United Kingdom, the Vale of Rheidol Railway did not have a period of closure between its being part of the national rail system and becoming a heritage railway, and so has operated a continuous service for residents and tourists.

History

Vale of Rheidol Light Railway Company
A narrow-gauge railway in the area of Aberystwyth was first proposed after the initial route planned for the Manchester and Milford Railway, from Llanidloes to Aberystwyth via Devil's Bridge, was altered, and then abandoned, before construction started.

The original primary purpose of the line was to carry timber (for pit props in the South Wales valleys) and lead ore from the Rheidol Valley to the sea and the main line railway at Aberystwyth. Many lead mines in the valley were producing ore at the end of the 19th century. Following an Act of Parliament in 1897, it was not possible to raise finance as quickly as expected, and construction commenced in 1901. To save money, rock was hand-hewn rather than blasted. Construction was overseen by the chief engineer, Sir James Szlumper, although he left day-to-day affairs in the hands of the main contractor employed.

In the Daily News of 9 August 1901 it was reported that the line was expected to be completed by March 1902 and the directors were hopeful for a free grant from the Treasury for the Aberayron Extension.

By the time the railway was ready to open in 1902, lead mining in Ceredigion was in steep decline. However a significant growth in tourism was under way, and the carriage of passengers soon became the principal traffic of the railway. It opened for mineral traffic in August 1902 and for passengers on 22 December 1902, using two 2-6-2T locomotives built by Davies and Metcalfe and the aforementioned Rheidol, built by Bagnall. The original stations were Aberystwyth (located on Park Avenue), Llanbadarn, Capel Bangor, Nantyronen and Devil's Bridge (Pontarfynach). A short branch ran along the Rheidol's bank to the harbour. The final construction cost was reported as £60,000.

The line was moderately successful as a tourist railway although local passenger and freight traffic remained limited, to the extent that the harbour branch was very little used throughout its existence. However, efforts were made to develop the tourist service over the summer seasons with the construction of open-sided carriages and such was the level of the tourist trade the locomotive Palmerston had to be hired from the Festiniog Railway over a number of summers pre-war (1912, 1913 and 1914) and again post-war (1921 and 1922).

Towards the end of its life as an independent company, the half-year revenue of the company as reported in February 1911 was £3,660.

As a branch of the Cambrian Railways
In 1912, plans for the use of electric power from the river were considered, but never likely to have taken place due to lack of capital, and were abandoned when the line was absorbed by the Cambrian Railways on 1 July 1913. The Cambrian Railways obtained the company for the seemingly bargain price of £27,311, when compared with the construction cost of £69,267. The onset of war in 1914 closed the lead mine and passenger services were reduced, which put the final nail in the coffin of any planned improvements. The reduction in passenger services and the need for timber for the war effort meant that freight became the principal revenue source for a short while. The line also served Army training camps in the valley.

Great Western Railway years
On 1 January 1922, as part of the Cambrian Railways the line was grouped into the Great Western Railway (GWR). A new station opened next to main standard gauge station in Aberystwyth. The GWR invested quite significantly in its new asset, overhauling one of the two Davies & Metcalfe locomotives and building two brand new locomotives at Swindon, which arrived in 1923. Works records appear to show that the GWR carried out heavy repairs to the original Prince of Wales whereas in reality the locomotive was scrapped and a brand new locomotive built to replace it.   Rheidol was withdrawn from traffic in 1924. New open carriages were built to replace the home-made examples used by the VoR and Cambrian, and in 1938 the closed carriages were entirely replaced by high quality modern replacements, all of which are still in service today.

The GWR recognised that traffic outside its tourist operations would be limited. After the end of 1931 the line became a summer operation only. In 1932, the one remaining original locomotive was sent back to Swindon works and put up for sale. A buyer was not forthcoming and so the locomotive was scrapped in 1935. In 1933 the harbour branch was formally abandoned. The entire line was closed for the duration of World War II, though maintenance continued. After closure for over six years, the railway reopened in June 1946.

Nationalisation

The Great Western Railway became part of the Western Region of British Railways on 1 January 1948 and the line continued to operate a tourist service. In the 1950s local managers ensured that the Vale of Rheidol line remained well looked after. The coaches carried British Rail's express livery. The locomotives acquired names in 1956 and fully lined express livery for the following season.

In the 1960s, the ex-Cambrian network of Western Region was transferred to the London Midland Region. A question mark hung over the VoR's future for some time, until the Minister for Transport, Barbara Castle, confirmed that it would remain open and in British Rail's hands. In 1968, the line was rerouted in Aberystwyth to run into the former standard gauge Carmarthen line platforms of the main station, which had been abandoned in 1964. This meant that the route of the line no longer dog-legged and did not have to cross Park Avenue by a level crossing. The former standard gauge locomotive shed was also refurbished and adapted into use for the VoR. The former station site is now occupied by a supermarket and the former route was sold for redevelopment.

In the late 1960s the line's locomotives and rolling stock were (somewhat controversially) painted into British Rail's corporate blue livery with the famous 'coming or going' logo emblazoned on loco and coach sides. This was gradually improved in the 1970s with lining and other embellishments, until in the 1980s a return to historical liveries was countenanced. This, together with occasional visits by Mountaineer of the Ffestiniog Railway and special trains such as Santa specials and even simulated Wild-West style Indian attacks, helped to keep the line's attraction fresh to the public, despite declining investment which resulted in insufficient maintenance – which culminated in a spectacular (though injury-free) derailment near Aberffrwd in 1986.

Under TOPS the steam locomotives were given the designation Class 98.

Privatisation

In 1989, the line was privatised and sold to Peter Rampton and Tony Hills (the late owner and General Manager of the Brecon Mountain Railway). In 1996, Rampton and Hills split their partnership, with Hills retaining control of the Brecon, and the Rheidol being sold to a trust formed by Rampton, the Phyllis Rampton Narrow Gauge Railway Trust. Unusually, the VoR operated completely without volunteers for approximately the first 20 years of its privatised operation.

Today

Route

 is the main terminus where the company's administrative headquarters and workshop are located. Leaving Aberystwyth, the line travels eastwards towards the village of Llanbadarn Fawr. Trains towards Devil's Bridge pause here briefly to activate the level crossing before proceeding. A short distance from Llanbadarn, the line passes over the River Rheidol on a timber trestle bridge and then passes the Glanyrafon Industrial Estate, before heading out into the open countryside. After    station is reached. There is a passing loop here and a station building. All trains stop here.

Leaving Capel Bangor the line passes the Rheidol Riding Centre before it begins to climb steeply through the woods at Tanyrallt. After about 10 minutes the train reaches  a small country station and request stop. Here locomotives take water from the water column before the train continues on the climb to Aberffrwd.

There is a passing loop here and a station building. All trains stop here. Beyond Aberffrwd the line climbs at a gradient of 1 in 50 all the way to Devil's Bridge. This section of the line is isolated with no road access.

When the lead mines were being worked there was an aerial cableway linking them with Rhiwfron. The railway had a branch line which ran to Aberystwyth Harbour, principally for freight services. The Harbour Branch became redundant with the predominance of tourist passenger operations and was closed and lifted. Little evidence of it remains today. The railway is promoted as one of The Great Little Trains of Wales, a joint marketing scheme launched in 1970 that encompasses eleven narrow gauge railways, mostly found in Wales. It continues to operate as a tourist railway, operating between Easter and the end of October, with extra services during February half-term and at Christmas. The timetable provides the operating dates. During the summer months, the railway offers a Driver for a Fiver experience on a short demonstration line at Devil's Bridge station.

Station restoration project
The railway carried out a major redevelopment project to enhance the facilities at many of the intermediate stations along the route. Raised platforms were built at the principal crossing and terminal stations, the first time in its history that the railway has had these. Additionally, new waiting shelters have also been provided at some locations in the style of original buildings which had been lost in previous decades.

Engineering workshop
There is a purpose-built restoration workshop at Aberystwyth which maintains the railway's rolling stock and also takes on contract work for other railways.

Operation

The operational base is at Aberystwyth, where there is an engine shed. Heavy overhauls are undertaken in a purpose-built workshop on the south side of the line.

Aberystwyth and Devil's Bridge stations have booking offices. For passengers joining the train at any intermediate station, tickets are issued by the Guard.

The railway is single track with passing loops at Capel Bangor and Aberffrwd which are operated by the train crew. The line is worked by tokens, which authorise the driver to enter a single line section. The whole line was originally worked by Tyer's Electric Staff instruments. Tokens are provided for:-

Aberystwyth to Capel Bangor
Capel Bangor to Aberffrwd
Aberffrwd to Devil's Bridge

A Duty Officer is rostered whenever a passenger service is in operation. The Duty Officer regulates train running, overseeing the token signalling system and giving permission for trains to enter the single line sections, recording train movements on the Train Graph and ensuring trains are formed of an appropriate number of carriages.

Special events
The railway operates a programme of special events throughout the year. These include 1920s Jazz Nights, evening specials, Halloween Ghost Trains, autumn colours trains, Santa Specials at Christmas and Wedding events.

In 2014 the line received its first visiting locomotive since the 1980s, when Palmerston returned from the Ffestiniog Railway for the first time since its original periods of hire around the First World War, and in 2015 the line held its first ever enthusiast-orientated gala event.

Television
The railway has been seen on television on many occasions, including an episode of Great British Railway Journeys filmed in 2012 and the detective series Y Gwyll filmed in 2016.

Awards
 2014, 2015, 2016, 2017, 2018 TripAdvisor, Certificate of Excellence
 2015 Aber First Awards, Best Customer Service.
 2015 Aber First Awards, Best Visitor Experience.
 2015, 2018 National Coach Tourism Awards, Finalist, Coach Friendly Heritage Railway.
 2016 National Coach Tourism Awards, Winner, Coach Friendly Heritage Railway.

Gallery

See also
British narrow gauge railways
Great Little Trains of Wales
List of British heritage and private railways
Tourism in Wales

References

Bibliography
Books:

Magazines:
 The Vale of Rheidol Newsletter published several times a year by the Vale of Rheidol Railway.

Multimedia:
 Vale of Rheidol Light Railway - Through the Years - published by Oakwood Video Library, 2014.
 Vale of Rheidol Railway - A Traveller's View - published by Ffestiniog Railway Company, 2014.

External links

Vale of Rheidol Railway website

 
British Rail passenger services
British Rail subsidiaries and divisions
Railway lines opened in 1902
Transport in Aberystwyth
Tourist attractions in Ceredigion
1 ft 11½ in gauge railways in Wales
1 ft 11¾ in gauge railways in Wales